Didier Meslard (14 January 1896 – 25 August 1963) was a French racing cyclist. He rode in the 1920 Tour de France.

References

1896 births
1963 deaths
French male cyclists
Place of birth missing